Burke is a surname or given name.

Burke may also refer to:

People 
 Burke baronets, two baronetcies created in the Baronetage of Ireland
 Edmund Burke, 18th century politician commonly referenced as simply "Burke"
 House of Burke or House of Burgh, ancient Anglo-Norman noble family
 James Burke: many people with this name including the British science history broadcaster. 
 Robert O'Hara Burke, Australian explorer

Places

Antartica 
 Burke Island, an island in the Amundsen Sea

Australia 
 Burke Developmental Road, a road in Queensland
 Burke, Wills, King and Yandruwandha National Heritage Place, a heritage-listed historic precinct on the Birdsville Track, Innamincka
 Shire of Burke, a local government area in Queensland
 Division of Burke (disambiguation)

Canada 
 Mount Burke (Alberta)
 Mount Burke (British Columbia)
 Burke Brook, part of the Don River in Toronto, Ontario

New Zealand 
 Burkes Pass, a mountain pass and town in South Canterbury, New Zealand

United States 
 Burke, Idaho, a ghost town in Shoshone County
 Burke (town), New York 
 Burke (village), New York
 Burke, South Dakota
 Burke, Texas
 Burke, Vermont
 Burke, Virginia
 Burke, Washington 
 Burke, Wisconsin, a town
 Burke (community), Wisconsin, an unincorporated community
 Burke Centre, Virginia, a census-designated place in Fairfax County, Virginia, United States
 Burke's Garden, Virginia, a valley and unincorporated community in Tazewell County, Virginia 
 Burke Lake, a freshwater reservoir in Fairfax Station, Fairfax County, Virginia
 Burke Lake Park, a public park in Fairfax Station, Fairfax County, Virginia 
 Burke Canyon, a canyon of the Burke-Canyon Creek, Shoshone County, Idaho
 Burke County (disambiguation) 
 Burke Mountain (Vermont)
 Burke Mountain Ski Area, a ski resort in northeast Vermont

Mercury
 Burke (crater), a crater on Mercury

Buildings 
 Burke Building, an historic building in Pittsburgh, Pennsylvania
 Burke Building (Manila), an historic building in Binondo, Manila, Philippines
 Burke Museum of Natural History and Culture, a natural history museum in Seattle, Washington
 Burke Library, an academic library of the Union Theological Seminary, Manhattan, New York City
 Burke Mountain Academy, a college-preparatory school in East Burke, Vermont
 Burke Rehabilitation Hospital, a non-profit rehabilitation hospital in White Plains, New York
 John S. Burke Catholic High School (referred to locally as Burke Catholic), a Roman Catholic high school in Goshen, New York
 Burke–Tarr Stadium, a football stadium in Jefferson City, Tennessee
 Edmund Burke School, a college preparatory school in Washington, D.C.
 Katherine Delmar Burke School, independent girls' school in the Sea Cliff neighborhood of San Francisco, California
 Omaha Burke High School, a secondary school in Omaha, Nebraska, United States
 Walter Burke Institute for Theoretical Physics, research center at the California Institute of Technology founded in 2014

Literature 
 "To Burke", a 1794 sonnet by Samuel Taylor Coleridge
 Burke, the protagonist of a series of novels by Andrew Vachss

Organisations 
 Burke Corporation, a foodservice manufacturer
 The Burke Group or Burke International, a US-based management consulting firm
 Edmund Burke Society, a conservative Canadian political organization
 Edmund Burke Foundation, Dutch think tank named after the Irish politician and philosopher
 Manley Burke, American legal professional association

Publications 
 Book of the de Burgos or Book of the Burkes, a late 16th-century Gaelic illuminated manuscript
 Burke's Peerage, an account of nobility, first published in 1826 by John Burke
 Burke's Landed Gentry, an account of families of the land-holding class, first published in 1833 by John Burke

Science
 Burke's theorem or Burke's Output Theorem
 Burke–Schumann flame, a type of diffusion flame

Ships
 USS Burke (DE-215), a Buckley-class destroyer escort of the United States Navy
 USS Arleigh Burke (DDG-51), lead ship of the Arleigh Burke-class guided missile destroyers
 Arleigh Burke-class destroyer, a United States Navy class of destroyer
 SS John Burke, a World War II American Liberty Ship built

Statues 
 Statue of Ernest Burke, a statue of the American baseball player Ernest Alexander Burke (1924–2004) in Havre de Grace, Maryland
 Statue of John Burke, a bronze sculpture by Avard Fairbanks, of the American politician John Burke (1859–1937), in the United States Capitol's National Statuary Hall

Television and Film 
 Hair-Trigger Burke, American silent Western film starring Harry Carey (1917)
 Stoney Burke (TV series), an American Western TV series starring Jack Lord (1962–1963)
 Burke's Law (disambiguation)
 The Burke Special, a British TV series hosted by James Burke (1972–1976)
 Burke & Hare (disambiguation)
 The Shannon Burke Show, American radio talk show talk show based in Orlando, Florida
 The Alan Burke Show, American syndicated talk show (1966–1970)

Transportation 
 Burke Avenue (IRT White Plains Road Line), a subway station in New York City, United States
 Burke Centre station, a railway station in Burke, Fairfax County, Virginia, United States
 Cleveland Burke Lakefront Airport, an airport in Cleveland, Ohio, United States
 Burke Road, a thoroughfare in Melbourne, Australia
 Burke–Gilman Trail, a rail trail in King County, Washington

Other 
 Burke and Wills expedition, an Australian exploration expedition (1860–61)
 Burke Act, a 1906 US congressional act relating to Native American enfranchisement
 Burke Civil War, a conflict in Ireland in the 1330s

See also 
 Burke Ministry (disambiguation)
 
 Berk (disambiguation)
 Bourke (disambiguation)
 Burk (disambiguation)